Patricia "Tricia" Penrose (born 9 April 1970) is an English actress and singer. She was know as the nation's favorite in the United Kingdom as barmaid Gina ward during the 1990s, 2000s and into the 2010s. Her role as Gina Ward in ITV's long-running 1960s drama Heartbeat, she played continuously for 17 years from 1993 to 2010. She has also appeared on The Royal, Coronation Street, Emmerdale, Boon, Justice, Fort Boyard, The Bill and Dancin' Thru the Dark. As well as her acting roles, she has had her own show on Radio Wirral and since 2021 has been working on some shows for BBC Radio 4.

Singing career
Although primarily focused on her acting career, Penrose has also had an interest in the music industry, releasing two singles – "Where Did Our Love Go?" (1996, UK No. 71) and "Don't Wanna Be Alone" (2000, UK No. 44). In 2002, she reached the final of A Song for Europe (the competition to select the UK's Eurovision Song Contest entry) but did not win. In 2004, however, she won a Christmas edition of the ITV show Stars in Their Eyes, performing as Brenda Lee and singing "Rockin' Around the Christmas Tree". She previously appeared in the show as Lisa Stansfield.  She has also sung a number of times on Heartbeat, her character Gina even won a talent contest in an episode in series 2, with her version of the Lulu hit "Shout".

Acting career
Penrose's first television role was as WPC Emma Reid in Brookside. In 1987 she appeared in the ‘A Ride on the Wild Side’ episode of Boon as Lindy Yates (1 episode, 1987), before a cast role in 1988's “Vroom.”  Penrose appeared in a 1990 episode of "Medics" as the character Jean and in the same year had a part in “Dancin' Thru the Dark”

Penrose appeared in Emmerdale Farm (now “Emmerdale”) in 1991 as Louise and then in two episodes of Coronation Street in 1991/92.

Penrose's appearance as Carol the Barmaid in 1993's “Terraces” was followed by her longest running role as Gina Ward in  Heartbeat where she appeared in over 300 episodes between 1993 and the series final episode in 2010, making her the longest serving female cast member. Gina was an extremely popular character and her on/off relationship with Phil Bellamy (played by Mark Jordon) kept viewers hooked up until they got married in series 17.  Gina arrived in the village of Aidensfield in episode 4 (Bitter Harvest) of series 2 in a bright red Isetta Bubble Car and in series 9 she changed the Isetta for a white VW Beetle, which she had up until the last episode in series 18. The Isetta is currently on display in Beaulieu motor museum. She is also a supporter of the annual Heartbeat car rally which is held in Goathland every year and often attends to meet and greet fans of the show, usually with co-star David Lonsdale. 

Penrose also appeared (as Gina Ward) in 2 episodes of the Heartbeat spin-off The Royal in 2003.

In 2011 Penrose appeared as Hayley Gosling in the critically acclaimed British legal drama, Justice.

Celebrity appearances
In 2001, Penrose appeared on Lily Savage's Blankety Blank. In 2007, she came second in the third series of Comic Relief Does Fame Academy on BBC1, beaten by Tara Palmer-Tomkinson.

In 2008, she released an aerobics DVD. In July 2010, she was a contestant on the BBC programme Celebrity MasterChef, but she was eliminated at the first hurdle after serving uncooked liver.

Penrose appeared in the ITV programme Sing If You Can in May 2011 in order to help raise money for the Teenage Cancer Trust charity.

In January 2013, she appeared as a housemate on Celebrity Big Brother 11. As part of Big Brothers task, she was initially chosen to enter the main luxury house instead of the basement. Penrose was evicted in a semi-final double eviction, alongside Frankie Dettori on Day 21, to the song "Heartbeat" by Enrique Iglesias. 

In September 2014, she appeared on ITV programme Who's Doing the Dishes?, preparing a prawn cocktail starter, roast beef dinner and berry meringue, even with the Heartbeat clues the guests did not guess their celebrity chef.

In 2015, she appeared in Big Star's Little Star with her son Freddy. On 14 April 2018, Penrose appeared on Pointless Celebrities along with Bill Maynard, his last television appearance before his death in that year.  She made a further appearance in 2022, this time with actress Denise Black.

Roy Castle Ambassador
Penrose's mother Sue was diagnosed with lung cancer in 2010 and, through her treatment, Penrose became involved with Roy Castle Lung Cancer Foundation, quickly becoming an Ambassador and raising funds for the charity, including recording "You Had a Dream in Your Heart" written by Professor Ray Donnelly (who founded the organisation), to mark the organisation's 25th anniversary in 2015.

Business interests
Penrose is a director of "Simply Luxury Travel", which specialises in luxury holidays, and also "Adlington Memorial Park" which is England's largest private natural burial ground in Adlington, Cheshire, (in the grounds of the historic Adlington Hall estate)

References

External links
 
 Tricia Penrose Official website
 Adlington Memorial Park

1970 births
Living people
English television actresses
Actors from Kirkby
21st-century English women singers
21st-century English singers